Vernon Malone (December 20, 1931 – April 18, 2009) was a Democratic member of the North Carolina General Assembly representing the state's fourteenth Senate district from 2003 until his death in 2009. His district included constituents in Wake County. A retired teacher and educational administrator from Raleigh, Malone was a graduate of Shaw University and held public offices in Wake County for over three decades.

Malone was born in Wake Forest on December 20, 1931.

As school board chairman, he presided over the merger of Raleigh city schools and Wake County public schools in 1976. He served as a Wake County commissioner from 1980 until his election to the Senate in 2002.

In the Senate, Malone continued to work in education. He was co-chairman of the Senate's higher education committee and appropriations committee for higher education.

Outside of public office, Malone worked as a classroom teacher and as a school administrator before becoming superintendent of the Governor Morehead School for the blind in Raleigh.

Malone served as vice-chair of Shaw University's board of trustees, as well as a trustee for North Carolina State University, the North Carolina Museum of Art and Wake Education Partnership. He was also a director of Capital Bank, a community bank headquartered in Raleigh.

He was an alumnus of Alpha Phi Alpha fraternity.

Malone died at his home in Raleigh on April 18, 2009.

The Vernon Malone Career and College Academy, an application-based public school in the Wake County Public School System opened in 2014 and named for the former educator.  The school focuses on career and technical education (CTE).

References

External links
North Carolina General Assembly - Senator Vernon Malone official NC Senate website
Project Vote Smart - Senator Vernon Malone (NC) profile
Follow the Money - Vernon Malone 2008200620042002 (campaign contributions)

1931 births
2009 deaths
County commissioners in North Carolina
Democratic Party North Carolina state senators
Shaw University alumni
20th-century American politicians
21st-century American politicians
20th-century African-American politicians
21st-century African-American politicians
People from Wake Forest, North Carolina